Latifur Rahman (1936–2017) was the 10th Chief Justice and the 2nd Chief Adviser of Bangladesh.

Latifur Rahman may also refer to:
 Latif-ur Rehman (born 1929), Pakistani hockey player.
 Latifur Rahman (businessman) (1945–2020), Bangladeshi industrialist.
 Latifur Rahman (politician), Bangladesh Jamaat-e-Islami politician from Chapai Nawabganj District.